Stereosticha is a moth genus in the subfamily Autostichinae. It contains the species Stereosticha pilulata, which is found in Sri Lanka.

The wingspan is about 9 mm. The forewings are dark fuscous, with a slight purplish tinge and a small ochreous-whitish spot on the costa before one-third, as well as a small round pale ochreous-yellowish spot in the disc beyond two-thirds. The extreme costal edge is shortly whitish above this. The hindwings are dark fuscous.

References

Autostichinae
Moths described in 1913